Prado is a Spanish municipality in the province of Zamora, autonomous community of Castile and León. Its area is 10.95 km², and it had a population of 99 in 2004.

This article contains information from the Spanish Wikipedia article Prado (Zamora), accessed on January 6, 2008.

References 

Municipalities of the Province of Zamora